Costa de' Nobili is a comune (municipality) in the Province of Pavia in the Italian region Lombardy, located about  southeast of Milan and about  southeast of Pavia.

Costa de' Nobili borders the following municipalities: Corteolona e Genzone, Pieve Porto Morone, San Zenone al Po, Santa Cristina e Bissone, Spessa, Torre de' Negri, Zerbo.

References

Cities and towns in Lombardy